Caldimicrobium rimae  is an extremely thermophilic, strictly anaerobic and facultatively chemolithoautotrophic bacterium from the genus of Caldimicrobium which has been isolated from the Treshchinnyi Spring from Uzon Caldera in Russia.

Origins of taxonomical branch 
Caldimicrobium rimae varies from its family of Thermodesulfobacteriaceae as it is not capable of oxidizing organic acids or alcohols and use sulfur as an electron receptor.

References

External links 
Type strain of Caldimicrobium rimae at BacDive –  the Bacterial Diversity Metadatabase

 

Thermodesulfobacteriota
Bacteria described in 2009
Thermophiles